Canadensis is an unincorporated community in Barrett Township, Monroe County, Pennsylvania. Canadensis is home to a few small shops, restaurants and churches. The "crossroads", which is the intersection of Pennsylvania Routes 447 and 390, is the center of the community.

Pronunciation
Canadensis is pronounced Can-ah-DEN-sis.

Tourism

Canadensis is the "heart" of the Poconos; it is home to a number of bed and breakfasts. It is home to Spruce Lake Retreat. Spruce Lake hosts groups and also has an overnight camp and daycamp for kids.  The area is more for the outdoor enthusiasts, mostly during the summer. In the summer Canadensis serves as a home to many sleepaway campers from the tri-state area at Camp Canadensis. There are no actual tourism sites within Canadensis. Canadensis has a few restaurants and small businesses which function to serve the local economy rather than attract tourists.

Transportation
Canadensis has two state roads, Pennsylvania Route 447 and Pennsylvania Route 390, which intersect at the center of town. Its airport is the Flying Dollar Airport.

Bordering towns
Panther (north)
Skytop (northeast)
Buck Hill Falls (near Skytop)
Mountainhome (southwest)
Cresco (southwest)
Price Township (south)

Schools
Pocono Mountain School District
(Bordering East Stroudsburg Area School District)

Bais Menachem YDP (Youth Development Program), a branch of the central Tomchei Tmimim Lubavitch moved to Canadensis in the Summer of 2018.
Bais Menachem YDP is an all-male, ultra-orthodox, Chassidic, school for high school and college aged boys. Its core philosophies include Jewish and Chassidich principles, and ensuring that its students learn to become happy, healthy, respectful, and productive members of society at large. Bais Menachem YDP is an educational institution that besides for its standard educational pursuits does not stay bound to the rigid frameworks of some schools but encourages its students in their positive and healthy growth through music, art, self expression, and other creative forms.

Government
Canadensis has no formal government; it is under the jurisdiction of the Barrett Township Supervisors.

References

External links

Barrett Township
Pocono Mountain School District
Barrett Township Community Portal

Pocono Mountains
Unincorporated communities in Monroe County, Pennsylvania
Unincorporated communities in Pennsylvania